Vivant is a small social-liberal political party in Belgium founded by millionaire Roland Duchâtelet. In the regional elections in June 2004, the party formed a strategic alliance with the Flemish Liberals and Democrats (VLD). Both parties are founded on the principle of individualism and can be called liberal. In 2007, the party announced it would likely merge with the VLD.

Vivant is economically interventionist, advocating a basic income guarantee for all citizens. Vivant considers the basic income as an inalienable part of the legal minimum wage (approximately half of it for full-time employment). In order to tax goods more evenly, wherever they are manufactured in order to respond to automatisation, globalization and an ageing population, Vivant proposes to shift taxes from labour to final consumption. (All taxes in the chain of production are an inclusive part of the price paid by the consumers and could be considered as a consumption tax, each tax in each stage with its specific side effects.) Vivant also proposes a flat tax on income in two steps, 0% on to 1350 Euro and 50% from there. The VLD doesn't support all of these measures. Vivant also has direct democracy as one of its key points.

In the regional elections of 2004, partner VLD lost heavily, dragging Vivant with it to third place among Flemish political parties. Although interest in Vivant increased during the elections, the party remained a marginal force in Belgian politics. Vivant is particularly strong in the German-speaking community of Belgium, where it won 7.3% and two representatives in the Parliament of the German community.

While vivant means "alive" or "lively" in French, as an acronym "VIVANT" stands for Voor Individuele Vrijheid en Arbeid in een Nieuwe Toekomst, ("for individual freedom and labour in a new future") in Dutch.

Elections
Vivant first took part in the federal elections for the Belgian Senate and Chamber of Representatives in 1999, but obtained no seats. The 2003 elections were no different. In 2004 there were elections of the European Parliament and the Belgian regional parliaments, where Vivant took part in a list-cartel with the VLD, but none of Vivant's candidates were elected. In 2006, Nele Lijnen became a co-opted member of the Senate.

See also
List of liberal parties
Liberalism in Belgium

References

External links
 Vivant official site
 http://www.vivanteurope.org/doc/THEME/th29_2_en.pdf

Political parties supporting universal basic income
Liberal parties in Belgium
Social liberal parties
Belgian nationalism
Eurosceptic parties in Belgium